Björn Rother (born 29 July 1996) is a German professional footballer who plays as defensive midfielder for  club Rot-Weiss Essen.

Career
In his youth, Rother played for TSV Hertha Walheim, Alemannia Aachen, and Bayer Leverkusen.

In the summer of 2015 he moved from the U19 of Leverkusen to the Werder Bremen reserves, playing in the 3. Liga. He made his debut on 5 September 2015, in the 3–1 defeat to Preußen Münster. He finished the 2016–17 season making 28 appearances and scoring one goal. On 2 June 2017, 3. Liga rivals 1. FC Magdeburg announced the signing of Rother on a two-year contract.

In June 2022 it was announced that Rother would join Rot-Weiss Essen, newly promoted to the 3. Liga, for the 2022–23 season. He moved on a free transfer from Hansa Rostock.

References

External links
 

1996 births
Living people
People from Stolberg (Rhineland)
Sportspeople from Cologne (region)
Footballers from North Rhine-Westphalia
German footballers
Association football midfielders
SV Werder Bremen II players
1. FC Magdeburg players
FC Hansa Rostock players
Rot-Weiss Essen players
2. Bundesliga players
3. Liga players